The Middle Fork Cut Off Trail is a  long hiking trail in Grand Teton National Park in the U.S. state of Wyoming. The trail connects the Rendezvous Mountain Trail with the Teton Crest Trail.

See also
 List of hiking trails in Grand Teton National Park

References

Hiking trails of Grand Teton National Park